I Am is the third studio album by German pop trio Monrose. It was first released by Starwatch Music, Cheyenne Records and Warner Music on 26 September 2008 in German-speaking Europe. The band reunited with frequent contributors Jiant and Snowflakers and Danish producer Jonas Jeberg to work on the bulk of the album, though several new collaborators were consulted to hand in music, including Ronny Svendsen and Nermin Harambasic from Norwegian music collective Dsign Music,  Oscar Gorres, Didrik Thott, Carl Björsell, JoelJoel, Guy Chambers, and OneRepublic frontman Ryan Tedder.

Taking Monrose's work further into dance and electro music, the album scored a generally negative reception from music critics, with laut.de calling them "the Sugababes for discount store-fans." Upon its release, I Am debuted at number nine on the German Albums Chart and reached top twenty in Austria and Switzerland. It spawned three singles, including Tedder-penned up tempo song "Strike the Match", which became a top ten hit in Germany, as well as "Hit'n'Run" and "Why Not Us", both of which missed the top ten.

Production and songs
The songs on I Am were selected out of more than six hundred demo tracks. The album's opening track, "Strike the Match", was penned by OneRepublic singer Ryan Tedder and Deborah Epstein. Selected out of several tracks in Tedder's repertoire, it was the first song confirmed to be appearing on the album. Released as its leading single, the song reached the top ten of the German Singles Chart. Second track "A Love Bizarre" is a cover version of the 1985 single by Sheila E. and Prince. Using the original instrumental as produced by Prince, the song has been described as all-time favorite by band member Guemmour. "Certified" was written by longtime contributors Edwin "Lil' Eddie" Serrano and Jonas Jeberg, and has been described as "high-pitched, technical, and scratching."

"Why Not Us" by Guy Chambers has been categorized as an "emotional mid-tempo ballad [...] for the wintertime." Originally planned to be released as the album's second single, it was released as the third. In addition, the song served as a promotional track for the We Love Otto mail order campaign. "Stolen" features background vocals by Jamie Pineda from the successful pop music project Sweetbox after Jamie had recorded the song first. Fifth track "Going Out Tonight" incorporates elements of ragga and dancehall music, including rapped verses by all three band members, while "You Can Look" combines dance-pop with rock music. "Teach Me How to Jump" deals with death. The song was recorded in dedication to lost ones, including Guemmour's father, who died in 1992.

Critical reception

I Am received mainly negative reviews. LetMeEntertainYou entitled the album's tracks as "sorted out material from the collection of immoral books of Timbaland," calling it also "fiddling" and "sparsely innovative." Further criticisms stated that the girls' voices had been edited into digital cawings which get dislodged from the professional but overproduced music. Although CDStarts dismissed Monrose's original R'n'B/Pop-style, it deplored their attempt to go more into electropop as doing them no favors, and suggested that it could lead to a downfall from their established position in the German music scene.

Chart performance
I Am debuted and peaked at number 9 on the German Albums Chart on 10 October 2008. It marked the band's third consecutive top ten entry and remained 14 weeks on the chart. In Switzerland, I Am debuted at number 14 on the Swiss Hitparade. It spent another four weeks on the chart. In Austria, the album became the band's first album to miss the top 20 of the Ö3 Austria Albums Chart. It peaked at number 20.

Track listing

Notes
 denotes additional producer
 denotes co-producer
Sample credits
"A Love Bizarre" is a cover version of the same-titled 1985 song performed by American singer Sheila E.

Charts

Release history

References

External links
 Monrose.de — official site

2008 albums
Monrose albums
Warner Music Group albums
Albums produced by Cutfather
Albums produced by Ryan Tedder